The Syria women's national handball team is the national team of Syria. It is governed by the Syrian Arab Handball Federation and takes part in international handball competitions.

History
The team first played at the 1987 Asian Championships, which were the first in the history of Asian women's handball. 

After winning 25–11 over Jordan and advancing from the group, they lost in the semifinals of the tournament with South Korea and then in the bronze medal match with Japan. Fourth place in the tournament is the biggest success of women's handball in Syria.

The team, shortly after its success at the Asian Championships, took fourth place at the home Mediterranean Games in Latakia, and in 1992 was bronze at the Pan-Arab Games in Damascus.

In 2017, after a long unsuccessful period, they won bronze medals at the West Asian Championships.

After checking out of several teams, they qualified for the 2021 Asian Championships in Amman, Jordan.

Competition record

Asian Championship
 Champions   Runners up   Third place   Fourth place

West Asian Championship

Mediterranean Games
 1987 – 4th

Pan Arab Games
 1992 –

Current squad
Team roster for the 2021 Asian Women's Handball Championship:

Coach: Vladimir Gligorov

Madeleine Ghanem 
Roaa Al -Asaad
Hanan Amaya 
Naglaa Al -Sharqi 
Ola Abu Ghazaleh 
Lynn Satouf 
Raghad Fadel 
Hajar Namouz 
Aya Al -Zanati 
Lynn Abbas 
Joy Al Jarrah 
Rasha Abdullah 
Majdoleen Sarita 
Mais Asi 
Linda Al -Hamwi 
Lujain Al -Hamwi 
Hadeel Hussein

References

Bell, Daniel (2003). Encyclopedia of International Games. McFarland and Company, Inc. Publishers, Jefferson, North Carolina. .

External links
IHF profile

Women's national handball teams
Handball
National team